The following is the Mongolia roster in the men's volleyball tournament of the 2018 Asian Games. 

Head coach: Solongo Dorj
<noinclude>

Asian Games
  to be determined

AVC Challenge cup
  to be determined

2018

|}

2022

Semifinals

|}

Third place match

|}

References

Mongolia at the Asian Games
Volleyball at the 2018 Asian Games